Isay is a surname. Notable people with the surname include:

 David Isay (born 1965), American radio producer
 Richard Isay (1934–2012), American psychiatrist, psychoanalyst, author, and gay activist

See also
 Isa (name)